Lake Station is a city in Lake County, Indiana, United States. The population was 12,572 at the 2010 census.

History

Initially, the site of modern Lake Station was the starting point of two Amerind trails leading to Fort Dearborn. Later it became an early stagecoach depot stop, as the Fort Dearborn-Detroit Stagecoach Route passed through the site during the wet season. The location became known as Lake Station as far back as 1851 when it began to serve as a depot, the western terminus of the Michigan Central Railroad (on what would later become its Detroit to Chicago line). This was the first train station in Lake County. The Michigan Central Railroad built a park and railroad shops around its two-story depot.

Being a bedroom community, Lake Station welcomed Abraham Lincoln to its Audubon Hotel, perhaps on more than one occasion, according to oral history. But George Pullman, who tried to negotiate for land in Lake Station for his proposed railcar company, never struck a deal and set up shop on the south side of Chicago instead. Prior to its current location in Crown Point, Indiana, the county seat was located on what is now the west end of Lake Station in a section called Liverpool, although it was a separate settlement at the time.

The name of Lake Station was officially changed to East Gary in 1908 in an attempt to lure executives from the nearby US Steel plant in Gary, Indiana into creating a suburban community. With another name change in 1977, primarily to disassociate itself from the urban decay and crime of Gary, the city reverted to its historical designation of Lake Station.

Lake Station also plays host to some events such as the Fuzz Follies, which is a car show that takes place in Riverview Park every year since 1984. Since 2004 The Heritage Days Festival has also taken place in Riverview Park. Both events are usually in June. The city's newest event held for the first time in September 2009 is Septemberfest, which is held around Labor Day weekend.

In September 2015, the mayor of Lake Station, Keith Soderquist, and his wife, Deborah Soderquist, were found guilty of conspiracy, wire fraud and filing false income tax returns.  Under state law, a mayor convicted of a felony forfeits his elected office.

Lake Station remains a mostly residential community.

Politics
This is a list of mayors that served the city of Lake Station, Indiana.

1964–1972: Leo Meister
1972–1980: Carl Jacobs
1980–1984: Carl Miller
1984–1988: Arthur Hartley
1988–1992: Carl Miller
1992–1996: Dewey Lemley
1996–2007: Shirley A. Wadding
2008–September 11, 2015: Keith W. Soderquist (Removed from office after conviction in federal court)
September 11, 2015 – September 28, 2015: John McDaniel (Interim as City Council President)
September 28, 2015 to December 31, 2015: Dewey Lemley (Elected at caucus to replace Soderquist)
January 1, 2016 to December 31, 2019: Christopher Anderson
January 1, 2020 to Present: Bill Carroll

Geography
Lake Station is located at  (41.569836, -87.259785).

The city lies on the Calumet Shoreline, which is seen today as a sand ridge.

Major highways
  Interstate 65
  Interstate 80
  Interstate 90
  Interstate 94
  U.S. Route 6
  U.S. Route 20
  Indiana State Road 51

Lakes and rivers
Grand Boulevard Lake
Deep River

Surrounding cities
 Hobart
 Gary
 Portage

Parks
Four Winds Park
Columbus Park
Riverview Park
Miller Park
Mock Park
Deep River Outdoor Recreation Center
Johnson Park
Bicentennial Park
Warrick Park
Riley Park

Demographics

2010 census
As of the census of 2010, there were 12,572 people, 4,577 households, and 3,067 families residing in the city. The racial makeup of the city was 79.7% White, 3.6% African American, 0.5% Native American, 0.3% Asian, 11.7% from other races, and 4.1% from two or more races. Hispanic or Latino of any race were 28.0% of the population.

There were 4,577 households, of which 35.6% had children under the age of 18 living with them, 42.4% were married couples living together, 17.1% had a female householder with no husband present, 7.5% had a male householder with no wife present, and 33.0% were non-families. 26.5% of all households were made up of individuals, and 8.3% had someone living alone who was 65 years of age or older. The average household size was 2.72 and the average family size was 3.28.

The median age in the city was 35.4 years. 26.4% of residents were under the age of 18; 9% were between the ages of 18 and 24; 27.2% were from 25 to 44; 26.7% were from 45 to 64; and 10.7% were 65 years of age or older. The gender makeup of the city was 50.0% male and 50.0% female.

2000 census
As of the census of 2000, there were 13,948 people, 5,041 households, and 3,528 families residing in the city. The racial makeup of the city was 86.23% White, 0.77% African American, 0.50% Native American, 0.30% Asian, 0.05% Pacific Islander, 9.31% from other races, and 2.85% from two or more races. Hispanic or Latino of any race were 20.61% of the population.

There were 5,041 households, out of which 33.8% had children under the age of 18 living with them, 48.9% were married couples living together, 14.5% had a female householder with no husband present, and 30.0% were non-families. 23.4% of all households were made up of individuals, and 8.4% had someone living alone who was 65 years of age or older. The average household size was 2.75 and the average family size was 3.24.

In the city, the population was spread out, with 27.1% under the age of 18, 10.5% from 18 to 24, 30.7% from 25 to 44, 21.0% from 45 to 64, and 10.6% who were 65 years of age or older. The median age was 33 years. For every 100 females, there were 99.6 males. For every 100 females age 18 and over, there were 98.4 males.

The median income for a household in the city was $36,984, and the median income for a family was $41,454. Males had a median income of $35,761 versus $22,659 for females. The per capita income for the city was $15,319. About 10.6% of families and 14.6% of the population were below the poverty line, including 21.3% of those under age 18 and 10.0% of those age 65 or over.

Education
Lake Station Community Schools serves most of Lake Station. Some portions are served by River Forest Community School Corporation.

The Lake Station Community Schools district consists of two elementary schools, Virgil I. Bailey and Alexander Hamilton, and one combined junior and senior high school Thomas A. Edison Junior-Senior High School.

The River Forest Community School Corporation serves the West End of Lake Station (approximately one-third of the city). River Forest High School, River Forest Junior High School, John I. Meister Elementary School, and Henry S. Evans Elementary School are all within the city limits of Lake Station (as the result of the city's 1972 annexation of previously unincorporated parts of Hobart Township).

Public libraries
Lake County Public Library operates the Lake Station - New Chicago Branch, which also serves New Chicago, at 2007 Central Avenue in Lake Station.

Economy

Some major employers are the Sun Engineering Company and Pro-Chem-Co, Inc. However the area has a strong railroad industry. Lake Station's busiest rail line is CSX Transportation's Porter Subdivision. The Chicago, Fort Wayne and Eastern Railroad also runs through Lake Station, crossing at Liverpool Road.

The Joliet Line of the Michigan Central Railroad once ran through Lake Station, along Fairview Road and through Liverpool near where the CF&E crosses Liverpool road. The Fairview Walkway now occupies the right of way between Fayette Road and Grand Boulevard.

References

External links
 City of Lake Station, Indiana website

Cities in Indiana
Cities in Lake County, Indiana
Northwest Indiana
1852 establishments in Indiana
Populated places established in 1852